Paul Hulme (born 19 April 1966) is a former professional rugby league footballer who played in the 1980s and 1990s.

Playing career

International honours
While at Widnes Hulme was selected to go on the 1988 Great Britain Lions tour. He won caps for Great Britain in against Australia (2 matches), and New Zealand. He was also selected to go on the 1992 Great Britain Lions tour of Australia and New Zealand, playing against New Zealand (2 matches), and in 1992 against Australia (2 matches), and New Zealand.

World Club Challenge appearances
Paul Hulme played right- in Widnes' 30-18 victory over Canberra Raiders in the 1989 World Club Challenge at Old Trafford, Manchester on Wednesday 4 October 1989.

John Player Special/Regal Trophy final appearances
Paul Hulme played as an interchange/substitute (replacing  Emosi Koloto) in Widnes' 6-12 defeat by Wigan in the 1988–89 John Player Special Trophy Final during the 1988–89 season at Burnden Park, Bolton on Saturday 7 January 1989, and played  in the 24-0 victory over Leeds in the 1991–92 Regal Trophy Final during the 1991–92 season at Central Park, Wigan on Saturday 11 January 1992.

Testimonial match
Paul Hulme's Testimonial match at Widnes took place in 1993.

Genealogical information
Paul Hulme is the younger brother of the rugby league footballer, David Hulme, and is the uncle of the rugby league footballer for Widnes Vikings, and Toulouse Olympique Danny Hulme. Two of Paul Hulme's sons also currently play rugby league; Liam Hulme played for Warrington Wolves and Swinton Lions, and his youngest son Lewis Hulme plays for Widnes Vikings.

References

External links
Statistics at wolvesplayers.thisiswarrington.co.uk

1966 births
Living people
English rugby league players
Great Britain national rugby league team players
Rugby league hookers
Rugby league players from Widnes
Rugby league second-rows
Swinton Lions players
Warrington Wolves players
Widnes Vikings captains
Widnes Vikings players